Rossia glaucopis is a species of bobtail squid native to the southeastern Pacific Ocean, specifically the waters around Chile.

The type specimen was collected off Chile. The type repository is unknown.

References

External links

Bobtail squid
Molluscs of the Pacific Ocean
Molluscs of Chile
Cephalopods described in 1845